Tyler Carter (16 January 1994) is an American paralympican alpine skier.

Early life
Carter was born on 16 January 1994 in Reading, Pennsylvania, United States of America.

Career
He participated in the Paralympics three times: Sochi 2014, Pyeongchang 2018, Beijing 2022. In the Paralympics to date, he has participated in various alpine skiing disciplines such as Giant slalom, Slalom and Downhill. It is also a manifestation of his motto as a disabled athlete, "Never ever give up, because you accomplish amazing things if you try".

He also served as the flag bearer of the USA at the Beijing Paralympics.

Carter participated in the 2015 World Champion.

References

External links
 TC Ski - Official website of Paralympian Tyler Carter
  at the U.S. Paralympic Team
  - International Paralympic Committee

1994 births

Living people
Alpine skiers at the 2022 Winter Paralympics
Paralympic alpine skiers of the United States